Andrew Thomas Knights Crozier (26 July 1943 – 3 April 2008) was a poet associated with the British Poetry Revival.

Life
Crozier was educated at Dulwich College, and later Christ's College, Cambridge. His 1976 book Pleats won the Alice Hunt Bartlett Prize, awarded jointly that year with Lee Harwood. He was co-editor of the important Revival magazine The English Intelligencer and for many years ran Ferry Press, an independent poetry publisher that issued books by Anthony Barnett, David Chaloner, Douglas Oliver, J. H. Prynne, Peter Riley, and others. With Tim Longville he edited the influential anthology A Various Art. He also edited the poems of Carl Rakosi and John Rodker. His collected poems, All Where Each Is was published in 1985. Crozier was Professor of Prose at the University of Sussex, where his research interests were listed as English and American poetry and poetics, with special reference to the romantic and modern periods.

Andrew Crozier died from a brain tumour on 3 April 2008.

Bibliography
 Loved Litter of Time Spent, Buffalo, NY: Sum Books, 1967
 Train Rides, Pampisford, UK: R Books, 1968
 Walking on Grass, London: Ferry Press, 1969
 In One Side & Out the Other (with John James & Tom Phillips), London: Ferry Press, 1970
 Neglected Information, Sidcup, UK: Blacksuede Boot Press, 1972
 The Veil Poem, Providence, RI: Burning Deck, 1974
 Printed Circuit, Cambridge, UK: Street Editions, 1974
 Seven Contemporary Sun Dials (with Ian Potts), Brighton, UK: Brighton Festival, 1975
 Pleats, Bishops Stortford, UK: Great Works Editions, 1975
 Residing, Belper, UK: Aggie Weston's, 1976
 Duets, Guildford, UK: Circle Press, 1976
 High Zero, Cambridge, UK: Street Editions, 1978
 Were There, London: Many Press, 1978
 Utamaro Variations (with Ian Tyson), London: Tetrad, 1982
 All Where Each Is, London: Allardyce, Barnett, 1985
 A Various Art (co-edited with Tim Longville), Manchester, UK: Carcanet, 1987
 Star Ground, Lewes, UK: Silver Hounds, 2008
 "Free Verse" as Formal Restraint, Bristol: Shearsman, 2015

References

External links
 Obituary: Independent
The English Intelligencer Archive
 British Poetry at Y2K
Andrew Crozier 1943-2008 A "cyber-tombeau" at Silliman's Blog by poet Ron Silliman includes comments, tributes, and links
The Death of Andrew Crozier obituary at the EYEWEAR website
Records of Andrew Crozier are held by Simon Fraser University's Special Collections and Rare Books

1943 births
2008 deaths
British Poetry Revival
Alumni of Christ's College, Cambridge
People educated at Dulwich College
Academics of the University of Sussex
Deaths from brain cancer in the United Kingdom
British male poets
20th-century British poets
20th-century British male writers
21st-century British male writers